Song Phi Nong is the southernmost district (amphoe) of Suphan Buri province, central Thailand.

History
The district was established in 1896. In the past the area of the district included U Thong district. The district office was moved away from the Song Phi Nong canal to the present location in 1964 because the old location was prone to flooding.

Its name Song Phi Nong means 'two siblings'. Presumably it refers to the confluence of two watercourses Tha Wa and Chorakhe Sam Phan before flowing to Tha Chin River. There is also another explanation that is a folk tale about two brothers or two elephants that are siblings.

Geography
Neighboring districts are (from the north clockwise): U Thong and Bang Pla Ma of Suphan Buri Province; Lat Bua Luang of Ayutthaya province; Bang Len and Kamphaeng Saen of Nakhon Pathom province; and Tha Maka and Phanom Thuan of Kanchanaburi province.

The main water resource of the district is the Tha Chin River or Suphan River.

Administration

Central administration
Song Phi Nong is divided into 15 subdistricts (tambons), which are further subdivided into 140 administrative villages (mubans).

Local administration
There is one town (thesaban mueang) in the district:
 Song Phi Nong consisting of subdistrict Song Phi Nong.

There is one subdistrict municipality (thesaban tambon) in the district:
 Thung Khok consisting of parts of subdistrict Thung Khok.

There are 14 subdistrict administrative organizations (SAO) in the district:
 Bang Len consisting of subdistrict Bang Len.
 Bang Ta Then consisting of subdistrict Bang Ta Then.
 Bang Takhian consisting of subdistrict Bang Takhian.
 Ban Kum consisting of subdistrict Ban Kum.
 Hua Pho consisting of subdistrict Hua Pho.
 Bang Phlap consisting of subdistrict Bang Phlap.
 Noen Phra Prang consisting of subdistrict Noen Phra Prang.
 Ban Chang consisting of subdistrict Ban Chang.
 Ton Tan consisting of subdistrict Ton Tan.
 Si Samran consisting of subdistrict Si Samran.
 Thung Khok consisting of parts of subdistrict Thung Khok.
 Nong Bo consisting of subdistrict Nong Bo.
 Bo Suphan consisting of subdistrict Bo Suphan.
 Don Manao consisting of subdistrict Don Manao.

References

External links
amphoe.com (Thai)

Song Phi Nong